Jenice Heo is an American artist and art director. In 2010, she won the 52nd Grammy Award for Best Boxed or Special Limited Edition Package for the Neil Young Archives Volume 1. She was nominated in the same category in 2015 for the vinyl box set of Neil Young's A Letter Home.

Life and art

Heo was born in South Korea, but she was raised in Texas and studied at the University of Texas at Austin. She started her career in Los Angeles as an Art Director in music packaging at Warner Bros. Records. With Jan Sheets, she created the artwork for Monster in My Pocket. Then she held jobs at A&M Records and Maverick Records. She worked with recording artists including Conor Oberst, Bright Eyes, Jim James, My Morning Jacket, Devendra Banhart, Jack White, Kurt Vile and Matt Corby. Heo and her husband Gary Burden have collaborated on the art direction and design of album covers as creative partners for many years.

When Heo collaborated with Young on the design of his Neil Young Archives Vol. I Box Set in 2010, Young introduced her to the work of assemblage artist Wallace Berman, who would prove influential to her "NEIL" painting on the Vol. I box. The art team that worked on the Archives - Young, Heo and Gary Burden - won the 52nd Grammy Award for Best Boxed or Special Limited Edition Package in 2010. It was the first Grammy not only for the couple, but also for Neil Young. Heo worked with Young on several more albums.

After winning the Grammy, Heo began working on what would eventually become known as the Neil Young Series. Comprising thirteen oil paintings on found objects and mixed media assemblages, the series was originally inspired by a work of art by Heo. It was a small assemblage called "NEIL Letters" which appeared on the top panel of the Archives box set. The series, containing personal photographs of Young's life and found objects pointing to the themes of his music, was hailed as "an intimate look into the mind of the famed musician." Young himself described the paintings as "a series of painted assemblages reflecting the spirit of different times and stages of my musical journey."

Awards

References

External links
 
 A list of Heo's art direction and design work

20th-century American painters
21st-century American painters
American people of Korean descent
American art directors
Painters from Texas
Album-cover and concert-poster artists
Living people
Year of birth missing (living people)